Memorial Cross Park, also known as Mission Cross Park, is a small  city park in Santa Clara, California which was the second, temporary site of the Mission Santa Clara de Asís, from 1779 to 1784. A large granite cross was donated to the city by a local Lions Club in 1953 and stood there until it was removed in late 2016 following a federal lawsuit filed by the Freedom from Religion Foundation.

History
The Mission Santa Clara de Asís was founded along the banks of the Guadalupe River, with the first Mass held on January 12, 1777. In January 1779, the Guadalupe flooded the original site, destroying it, and a second site was blessed by Father Junipero Serra on November 11, 1779. The first site later was designated California Historical Landmark No. 250. The cornerstone for a new church was laid on November 19, 1781 at a third site, and after it was completed in May 1784, services were moved there from the temporary second site.

This second Mission site is occupied by the present Mission (or Memorial) Cross Park, at the northeast corner of the intersection of De La Cruz and Martin. The city purchased the land as a park before 1907. Reportedly, there were four structures at the second site: a church and sacristry, measuring 6×25 varas (a vara is a customary unit of measurement equal to ); servant's quarters (5×10 varas); a kitchen and shop (5×10 varas); and a residence and storeroom (5×45 varas). The Native American Marcello, said to be "the Last of the Mission Indians", assisted in constructing the second site. However, the precise locations of the first two sites have not been proven; a cultural resource management project was conducted in the late 1970s covering the purported sites prior to an expansion of San Jose International Airport, involving a surface survey and trenching, which provided no definitive evidence for the presence of the mission at the first two claimed locations.

That cross incorporated a fragment of the original 1777 cross and used the wooden timbers from the cross erected by Fr. Serra in 1781 at the third Mission site; the timbers, in turn, had been part of the first Mission building built in 1777. The original 1777 cross had been rebuilt and encased in new material in 1902 following a windstorm that had knocked it down, and the 1907 cross sealed the 1781 timbers in a similar manner. The president of Santa Clara College, Richard A. Gleeson, S.J., delivered the keynote speech during the dedication ceremony, entitled "The Birth of Christianity and Dawn of Civilization in Santa Clara Valley"; other speakers included James R. Daily, reading "The Mission Cross", a poem by Charles F. Walsh; Rev. John W. Dinsmore ("Footprints of the Padres"); and historian Dr. George Wharton James ("Junipero Serra, Pioneer of Pioneers"). Politicians attending included former San Francisco Mayor James D. Phelan, who delivered brief remarks: "I am reminded of the American traveler who received a just rebuke from Lord Byron, who refused to see him because the American had never beheld Niagara Falls. We should first see and know our own land" as well as Congressman Joseph R. Knowland.

The granite cross was originally donated by the local Lions Club. It weighs  and was cut in Santa Rosa by Massimo Galeazzi to a design by John Costa, although Jess Talancon would claim credit for design and execution in the 1970s; the granite was quarried from Rocklin. The park was developed in 1956, and the cross was rededicated to the city in 1961.

The Freedom from Religion Foundation (FFRF) complained in 2012 the granite cross, sited on public land, violated the Constitutional separation of church and state in the United States. FFRF followed by filing a federal lawsuit on April 20, 2016 in the Northern District of California, with the suit heard by Judge Lucy H. Koh. City attorney Richard Nosky recommended to the City Council in November 2016 that ownership of the cross be transferred to Santa Clara University (SCU), with SCU bearing the cost of removal and moving; the council unanimously approved the recommendation. The city removed the cross on December 27, 2016.

The grounds of Memorial Cross Park are landscaped with oleander and olives, and adobe perimeter walls similar to early mission days bound the site. A small tiled shrine is dedicated to Saint Clare of Assisi. Low-maintenance grass was installed along the street edge in 2018.

References

External links

Santa Clara, California